Gržeča Vas (in older sources also Gršeča Vas) is a village west of Veliki Podlog in the Municipality of Krško in eastern Slovenia. The area is part of the traditional region of Lower Carniola. It is now included with the rest of the municipality in the Lower Sava Statistical Region.

References

External links
Gržeča Vas on Geopedia

Populated places in the Municipality of Krško